Eugenio Emilio Umanzor Andino  (born 19 October 1973) is a Honduran football coach.

Club career
Umanzor played for hometown side Social Sol in the Honduran second division.

Managerial career
Umanzor brought Real Juventud to the Honduran top division winning two consecutive championships, 2007-08 Apertura and 2007-08 Clausura but was replaced by Edwin Pavón in October 2008 after he left the club citing they owed him wages. 

He has been coach of the Honduras U-17 national football team and Honduras U-20 national football team. He is the only coach to qualify two world cups in the same year.

In June 2011 he took charge of second division side Parrillas One but  left them after club president Luis Girón released four players without consulting Umanzor.
In December 2012, Umanzor was named the new manager of Deportes Savio
but he was dismissed in March 2013.

He was appointed manager of Honduran second division outfit Lepaera San Isidro for the 2013 Apertura.

References

External links
Umanzor reads the riot act at fifa.com

1973 births
Living people
People from Yoro Department
Association football defenders
Honduran footballers
Honduran football managers
Juticalpa F.C. managers